The Enguri (Egry , Inguri) is a river in western Georgia. It originates near Ushguli in northeastern Svaneti and plays an important role providing hydroelectric power to the area.

The river emerges from the high Caucasus near the highest mountain in Georgia, Shkhara, and winds through the mountain valleys to the northwest before turning southwest to empty into the Black Sea near Anaklia.

Since the Abkhaz–Georgian conflict, both Georgia and Abkhazia keep troops on the river; Russia also keeps peacekeeping troops. There are also a number of illegal connections across the river.

The river plays an important role in the Georgian energy production. The underground water works produce about 40% of the national energy. The capacity is 1,300 megawatts.

See also 
Abkhazia–Georgia border
Mulkhura

References

External links

Die Brücke der Deutschen Eurasian Magazine  

Rivers of Abkhazia
Rivers of Georgia (country)
Abkhazia–Georgia (country) border
Tributaries of the Black Sea